The secretary of state for international trade, also referred to as the international trade secretary, was a secretary of state in the Government of the United Kingdom, with overall responsibility for the business of the Department for International Trade and UK Export Finance. The incumbent was a member of the Cabinet of the United Kingdom. Since the office's inception, the incumbent was concurrently been appointed President of the Board of Trade.

The office holder worked alongside the other International Trade ministers. The corresponding shadow minister is the shadow secretary of state for international trade. The secretary of state is also scrutinised by the International Trade Select Committee.

The final officeholder was Kemi Badenoch, following her appointment by Prime Minister Liz Truss in September 2022; she was subsequently reappointed by Rishi Sunak in October 2022. In February 2023, the position was abolished, with its duties merging with those of the Business Secretary to become Secretary of State for Business and Trade.

Responsibilities
Corresponding to what is generally known as a commerce minister in many other countries, the international trade secretary's remit includes:

 Forming new free trade agreements for the United Kingdom
 Managing the development of freeports across Britain
 Maintaining current trade agreements with other countries
 Supporting British businesses with international trade

History
The office was created by Prime Minister Theresa May shortly after she took office on 13 July 2016, following the 2016 EU referendum. The office's powers were taken from the trade functions of the secretary of state for business, innovation and skills, which was recreated as the secretary of state for business, energy and industrial strategy as part of a wider government reorganisation.

While the office of Secretary of State for International Trade provided trade services in the post-EU-referendum period, other departments and offices continued to play a role, e.g. DEFRA provided services to the EU and beyond.

List of secretaries of state
Colour key (for political parties):

See also 
 Shadow Secretary of State for International Trade
 First Lord of Trade
 Secretary of State for Business, Energy and Industrial Strategy
 Secretary for Overseas Trade
 Secretary of State for Exiting the European Union (position established concurrently)

References

External links
Department for International Trade Official Website

Ministerial offices in the United Kingdom
Trade ministers of the United Kingdom
2016 establishments in the United Kingdom
Trade in the United Kingdom
Department for International Trade
Ministries established in 2016
2023 disestablishments in the United Kingdom